The Icaro Cyber is an Italian single-place, paraglider that was designed and produced by Icaro 2000 of Sangiano. It is now out of production.

The Cyber 2 was designed by Michael Nessler and Christian Amon.

Design and development
The Cyber was designed as a beginner glider.

The design progressed through two generations of models, the Cyber and Cyber 2. The models are each named for their relative size.

Variants
Cyber S
Small-sized model for lighter pilots, introduced in 2001. The glider model is DHV 1 certified.
Cyber M
Mid-sized model for medium-weight pilots, introduced in 2001. The glider model is DHV 1 certified.
Cyber L
Large-sized model for heavier pilots, introduced in 2001. The glider model is DHV 1 certified.
Cyber 2 S
Small-sized model for lighter pilots. The glider model is DHV 1 certified.
Cyber 2 M
Mid-sized model for medium-weight pilots. The glider model is DHV 1 certified.
Cyber 2 L
Large-sized model for heavier pilots. The glider model is DHV 1 certified.

Specifications (Cyber 2 M)

References

Cyber
Paragliders